Pacharapun Chochuwong (born 29 January 1996) is a Thai badminton player.

Achievements

BWF International Challenge/Series 
Women's doubles

Mixed doubles

  BWF International Challenge tournament
  BWF International Series tournament
  BWF Future Series tournament

References

External links 
 

1996 births
Living people
Pacharapun Chochuwong
Pacharapun Chochuwong
Pacharapun Chochuwong